French nationality law is historically based on the principles of jus soli (Latin for "right of soil") and jus sanguinis, according to Ernest Renan's definition, in opposition to the German definition of nationality, jus sanguinis  (Latin for "right of blood"), formalised by Johann Gottlieb Fichte.

The 1993 Méhaignerie Law, which was part of a broader immigration control agenda to restrict access to French nationality and increase the focus on jus sanguinis as the citizenship determinant for children born in France, required children born in France of foreign parents to request French nationality at adulthood, rather than being automatically accorded citizenship. This "manifestation of will" requirement was subsequently abrogated by the Guigou Law of 1998, but children born in France of foreign parents remain foreign until obtaining legal majority.

Children born in France to tourists or other short-term visitors do not acquire French citizenship by virtue of birth in France: residency must be proven. Since immigration became increasingly a political theme in the 1980s, both left-wing and right-wing governments have issued several laws restricting the possibilities of being naturalized.

History
French nationality and citizenship were concepts that existed even before the French Revolution, loosely based on the premise that people spoke the same language within specific institutional frameworks.

Afterward, in the late 1700s and early 1800s, France was fairly unique among countries in tying its nationality laws to its election laws, and working to increase the joint ambit of citizenship and the right of the franchise.

19th century
There are three key dates in the legal history of naturalization:

Soon after the approval of the French constitutions, statesman Jean-Jacques-Régis de Cambacérès drafted and presented a new civil code that would unify private law, including nationality law—and with application for all French citizens outside of France.

Third Republic
Military service and state education were two processes central to the creation of a common national culture.  Military conscription (universal from 1872, in theory if not in practice) brought inhabitants of the state's regions together for the first time, creating bonds of friendship and encouraging the use of French rather than regional languages. Universal education (the aim of the Jules Ferry Laws, 1879–1886) brought the whole of the population into contact with state-sanctioned version of French history and identity.  State teachers, the "Black hussars of the Republic," conveyed the national language to the people of the regions.

In a series of expansions in the late 1800s, French nationality law was liberalized for great conferment of French citizenship, partly with an eye to increasing French military ranks. These included re-introduction of simple jus soli (at first with a right of the person to repudiate French citizenship, but that right was later removed), elimination of the loss of citizenship when emigrating from France, and repeal of the loss of citizenship by a French woman on marriage to a foreigner when she did not automatically obtain her husband's citizenship.

20th century
In 1927, French nationality law was further loosened to increase naturalization  so as to attract a larger work force for French industry. The measure also extracted the nationality law from the French civil code and made it an independent text, as it had grown too large and unwieldy.

Legislation in 1934, motivated by xenophobia, imposed burdens on naturalized citizens and provided the government powers to forfeit citizenship, which the Nazi-collaborator Vichy regime used widely.

A 1945 post-war measure promulgated a comprehensive nationality code that established very lengthy and detailed rules to shield citizens from government whimsy.

Amendments were by legislation in 1962 and by constitutions in 1946 and 1958, with the latter creating the status of "citoyen de la Communauté", vaguely akin to the British status of "Citizen of the United Kingdom and Colonies" established by the British Nationality Act 1948.

The 1993 law that attempted to restrict conferral of French citizenship also transferred the contents of the Code de la Nationalité Française back into the Code Civil, where they had existed from 1803 until 1927.

Acquisition of citizenship
There are various ways a person can acquire French citizenship, either at birth or later on in life. The nationality provisions of French law are detailed in the opening divisions of the :fr:Code civil des Français.

 The attribution of French nationality can be due to filiation. (Jus sanguinis)
 The attribution of French nationality can be given by birth in France (Jus soli) if other requirements (such as residence in France) are also met.

French citizenship by birth in metropolitan France and its overseas territories
Children born in France (including overseas territories) to at least one parent who was also born in France automatically acquire French citizenship at birth (double jus soli).

A child born in France to foreign parents may acquire French citizenship:
 at birth, if stateless.
 at 18, if resident in France with at least 5 years' residence since age 11.
 between 16 and 18 upon request by the child and if resident in France with at least 5 years' residence since age 11.
 between 13 and 16 upon request by the child's parents and if resident in France continuously since age 8.
 if born in France to parents born before independence in a former French sovereign colony/territory:
 at birth, if born in France before January 1, 1994.
 at age 18, if born in France on or after January 1, 1994.

A child who was born abroad and who has only one French parent can repudiate their French nationality during the six months prior to their reaching the age of majority, or in the year which follows it (article 19-4 of the Civil Code).

French citizenship by birth abroad to at least one French citizen
The child (legitimate or natural) is French if at least one parent is French.

In the case of an adoption, the child has French nationality only under the "full adoption" regime.

Parentage to the parent from whom the French nationality is claimed, must be established while the child is still a minor (under 18).

When the child is born abroad from a French parent, it is essential for the French parent to record the birth of the child in the French civil register. In the event of litigation or to establish definitive proof of French nationality (or request a French passport) French nationality may be established by petitioning for a French nationality certificate from the Tribunal d'Instance (local court) of the person's place of residence, or if residing abroad, via the Paris Court (service of French nationality) having jurisdiction over French persons residing abroad.

French citizenship by descent limitations
Article 30-3 of the French Civil Code (previously numbered Article 95 of the French nationality code) is a "long-standing bone of contention" in French nationality law that can act as a practical limitation on the number of generations under which French citizenship by descent may be transmitted through births outside France.

Under that provision, a person cannot prove his French citizenship by descent to French authorities when neither that person nor his French parent(s) had, for fifty years, "possession d'état de Français" (contact or links with French authorities, such as a French passport renewal, voting registration, French consular registration, and so on), while residing outside France.

The 1993 legislation did insert a new Article 21-14 into the Civil Code, offering such first and second generation offspring of French emigrants the opportunity to "reclaim French citizenship through simple declaration", if they demonstrate military, "cultural, professional, economic, or family connections with France".

French citizenship by birth in France
A child (legitimate or natural) is French if born in France to at least one parent who (i) is a French citizen; or (ii) was also born in France (even if the parent is not themselves a French citizen). The principle in point (ii) is known as double jus soli.

A child born in France before 1 January 1994 to a parent born in a former French overseas territory prior to its acquisition of independence, is automatically French. The same is true for a child born after 1 January 1963, to a parent born in Algeria before 3 July 1962.

Birth in France to foreign parents 
If both parents are foreign and neither parent was born in France, simply being born in France does not confer French citizenship at birth, except for children born to unknown or stateless parents, or if the citizenship laws of the parents' countr(y)/-ies of origin do not allow citizenship to be transferred to the child.

There are cases in which a child born in France to foreign parents can acquire French citizenship at various points during their childhood and upon turning 18, subject to certain conditions.

French citizenship acquired at age 13–16 
The foreign parents of a child aged between 13 and 16 can obtain French citizenship for their child by making a declaration if all of the following conditions are met:

 The child was born in France;
 The child has had their primary residence in France since the age of 8;
 The child resides in France on the day on which the parents make the declaration;
 The child consents to the declaration being made (unless the child has a mental or physical disability that renders consent impossible).

French citizenship acquired at age 16–18 
A child aged between 16 and 18 and born to foreign parents can obtain French citizenship by making a declaration if all of the following conditions are met:

 The child was born in France;
 The child resides in France on the day on which they make the declaration;
 The child has had their primary residence in France for a total (but not necessarily continuous) period of at least 5 years since the age of 11.

The child does not require parental consent to make this declaration, unless they have a mental or physical disability that renders them unable to perform the procedure unilaterally.

French citizenship acquired automatically at age 18 
A child born to foreign parents acquires French citizenship automatically upon turning 18 if all of the following conditions are met:.

 The child was born in France;
 The child resides in France on their 18th birthday; and
 The child has had their primary residence in France for a total (but not necessarily continuous) period of at least 5 years since the age of 11.

The child born in France to foreign parents, may however decline French nationality.

French citizenship by adoption

Plenary adoption is the only act of filiation which carries direct effects on nationality. Unlike the process of simple adoption, a child adopted according to the procedure of plenary adoption breaks any bond with his family of origin.

Filiation must be established while the child is a minor to take effect. Consequently, the recognition of a child older than the age of majority has no effect on his or her nationality.

French citizenship by naturalization

Eligibility resulting from residency
A person aged 18 or above may apply for French citizenship by naturalization after five years' habitual and continuous residence in France (if married and with children, then the applicant must be living in France with his/her family).  In addition, it is required that the applicant has his/her primary source of income in France during the five-year period.  Those applying who are not European Union, European Economic Area or Swiss nationals are required to be in possession of a "titre de séjour" (a residence permit).
 The residence period may be completely waived for those who have served in the French military, for refugees, or in other exceptional cases.
 The residence period can be reduced to two years for a person who has either (a) completed two years of higher education in France, leading to a diploma, or (b) has provided or can provide important services to France due to his or her skills and talents, or (c) has completed an exceptional path of integration (activities or actions carried out in the civic, scientific, economic, cultural or sporting fields, etc.) .

The residence period is counted backwards from the date on which the applicant lodged his/her naturalization application.

The applicant must show that he/she has been residing legally in France during the 5-year residence period. Any periods of irregular residence in France before the 5-year residence period will not be taken into account when the application is considered. If the applicant's residence period is completely waived, he/she must have resided legally in France in the 2 years immediately preceding the date on which he/she lodged his/her naturalization application.

Naturalization will only be successful for those who are judged to have integrated into French society (i.e. by virtue of language skills and understanding of rights and responsibilities of a French citizen, to be demonstrated during an interview at the local prefecture, as well as an ability and/or potential to integrate in the labour market), and who respect the values of French society. The applicant must also be of good character (no criminal offences with a sentence of 6 months' imprisonment or more and no tax avoidance). In assessing the applicant's character, the decision reached must be proportionate (for example, a naturalization application should not be rejected solely because the applicant occasionally declared/paid taxes late).

Naturalization through residency is accorded by publication of a decree in the Journal Officiel by decision of the Home Ministry and the prefecture of the region where the applicant has submitted his/her application.  There is an obligatory delay of 12 months from the date of submission before the applicant is notified of the result of his/her naturalization application.

Eligibility resulting from marriage to a French citizen

The partner of a French national can apply for nationality, and must be able to prove that they have been married for five years and live together, (four years if the couple can prove continuous residence in France for three years since the wedding, or if when living abroad, the French spouse has been registered as a French citizen living abroad (article 79 of law 2006-911 published in the JO of 25/07/2006).) The applicant must also have a good knowledge of the French language, spoken and written, and the couple must appear in person together to sign documents.

Eligibility resulting from service in the Foreign Legion.
Foreign nationals may apply for naturalization after three years of service in the Foreign Legion, a wing of the French Army that is open to men of any nationality. Furthermore, a soldier wounded in battle fighting for France may immediately apply for naturalization under the principle of "Français par le sang versé" ("French by spilled blood").

French citizenship and identity

According to the French Republic, the French people are those who are in possession of French nationality. According to the French Constitution, "France shall be an indivisible, secular, democratic and social Republic. It shall ensure the equality of all citizens before the law, without distinction of origin, race or religion. It shall respect all beliefs. It shall be organised on a decentralised basis." Article 1 

Since the middle of the 19th century, France has exhibited a very high rate of immigration, mainly from Southern Europe, Eastern Europe, the Maghreb, Africa and Asia. According to a 2004 report by INED researcher Michèle Tribalat, France has approximately 14 million persons (out of nearly 63 million, or approximately 22%) (see demographics of France) of foreign ascendancy (immigrants or with at least one parent or grandparent immigrant). In 2015, 7.3 million people born in France had at least one immigrant parent (roughly 11% of the population). The origin of the descendants of immigrants reflects the immigration flows that France has experienced for over a century.

The absence of official statistics on French citizens of foreign origin is deliberate. Under French law passed after the Vichy regime, it is forbidden to categorize people according to their ethnic origins. In France, like in many other European countries, censuses do not collect information on supposed ancestry. Moreover, all French statistics are forbidden to have any references concerning ethnic membership. Thus, the French government's assimilationist stance towards immigration as well as towards regional identities and cultures, together with the political heritage of the French Revolution, has led to the development of a French identity which is based more on the notion of citizenship than on cultural, historical or ethnic ties.

For that reason, French identity must not necessarily be associated with the "ethnic French people" but can be associated with either a nationality and citizenship, or a culture and language-based group. The latter forms the basis for La Francophonie, a group of French-speaking countries, or countries with historical and cultural association to France. The concept of "French ethnicity" exists outside France's borders, in particular in Quebec where some people claim membership to a "French ethnic group", but again many view it as not so much ethnicity-based as language-based and would also include immigrants from, for example, Lebanon and Haiti. France's particular self-perception means that French identity may include a naturalized, French-speaking ethnic Portuguese, Italian, Spaniard, Pole, Romanian, Lebanese, Vietnamese, Tunisian, Algerian or Moroccan. Nonetheless, like in other European countries, some level of discrimination occurs, and there are higher unemployment rates among job-seekers with foreign-sounding names.

Rights and obligations of French citizens
In modern France, in general, the rights are fundamentally the same as those in other EU countries.

Despite the official discourse of universality, French nationality has not meant automatic citizenship. Some categories of French people have been excluded, throughout the years, from full citizenship:
 Women: Until the Liberation, they were deprived of the right to vote. The provisional government of General de Gaulle accorded them this right by the 21 April 1944 prescription.
 Military: For a long time, the military was called the Grande muette ("The Big Mute") in reference to its prohibition against interfering in political life. During a large part of the Third Republic (1871–1940), the Army was in the main anti-republican (and thus counterrevolutionary), the Dreyfus Affair and the 16 May 1877 crisis that led to a monarchist coup d'état by MacMahon being examples of this anti-republican spirit. That character of the military would make them gain the right to vote only after the 17 August 1945 prescription, the contribution of De Gaulle to the interior French Resistance, which reconciled the Army with the Republic. Nevertheless, the members of the military do not benefit from all public liberties, as the 13 July 1972 law on the general statute of militaries specifies.
 Young people: The July 1974 law instituted at the instigation of the president Valéry Giscard d'Estaing reduced the coming of age to 18, which thus made some teenagers full citizens.
 Naturalized foreigners: Since 9 January 1973, foreigners who have acquired French nationality do not have to wait five years after their naturalization to be able to vote.
 Inhabitants of the colonies: The 7 May 1946 law stated that soldiers from the "Empire" (such as the tirailleurs) killed during World War I and World War II were not citizens.

Modern Citizenship is linked to civic participation (also called positive freedom), which includes voting, demonstrations, petitions, activism, etc.

Some scholars, such as Annette Joseph Gabriel, argue that citizenship is part of a colonial agenda and is not a universal practice. In order to create an equitable and safe space for all, she believes that there must be several different forms of belonging so that everyone feels included instead of being tied to one sole identity factor. She also argues for what she calls decolonial citizenship, which is work has already been done by black women such as Suzanne Cesaire, Jane Vialle, and Paulette Nardal. Although their activism fought against colonialism and fought for multiple cultural and racial identities to be noted, their ideologies were sadly overlooked and silenced.

Travel freedom of French citizens

Visa requirements for French citizens are administrative entry restrictions by the authorities of other states placed on citizens of France. As of January 2023, French citizens had visa-free or visa on arrival access to 187 countries and territories, ranking the French passport 6th in terms of travel freedom (tied with the Irish, Portuguese and British passports) according to the Henley Passport Index.

The French nationality is ranked number one as of 2018 in The Quality of Nationality Index (QNI). The ranking is considering internal factors such as peace & stability, economic strength, and human development and external factors such as travel freedom. France's comparative advantage lies in its greater settlement freedom (attributable mainly to the country's former colonial empire.)

Dual citizenship
Dual citizenship was officially recognized for both men and women on 9 January 1973; since then, possession of more than one nationality does not affect French nationality.

Before 19 October 1945, dual nationality was prohibited and any French national who acquired another nationality before that day automatically lost French nationality unless they were male nationals under the obligation of military service and did not sought for the release of their French nationality by decree. Until 1927, women who married a non-French national were also subject to the automatic loss of nationality if they acquired their husbands' nationalities upon marriage.

The 1945 French Nationality Code (ordonnance n° 45–2441) added a provision to indicate that for a maximum period of 5 years following the "legal cessation of hostilities", the permission for the loss of nationality must be sought from the French government if the person was male and under the age of 50. The transitional period was deemed to have ended on 1 June 1951. Also, the new code specified that a woman would lose her French nationality only when she declared that she did not want to remain French after marriage.

The 1954 amendment to the Nationality Code (loi n° 54-395) removed the five-year period and, retroactively from 1 June 1951, no male national of France under the age of 50 would be subject to the automatic loss provision (section 87) of the 1945 Nationality Code without the specific permission from the French government. This limited the automatic loss of nationality to men over 50 and women, as the permissions to lose French nationality were automatically given to them upon their naturalizations. In 2013, a woman who lost her French nationality under section 87 appealed to the Constitutional Council, which found the provision to be unconstitutional under the 1946 Constitution and the 1789 Declaration and ordered the reinstatement of her nationality. As a result of this decision, all women who lost their nationality between 1951 and 1973 solely under section 87 may voluntarily request for the reinstatement of their nationality by invoking this decision, and their descendents would also be able to invoke this decision if their female ancestors have done so.

Since 1973, dual nationality has been legalized for all French nationals, although a person might still be deprived of their French nationality under bilateral or multilateral treaties or agreements France concluded with other countries. In 2007, the Ministry of Justice concluded that a French male residing in the Netherlands and naturalized as a Dutch national in 2006 based on his marriage to a Dutch man lost his French nationality upon naturalization, because a 1985 agreement between France and the Netherlands stipulated that any national of either country who acquired the other country's nationality would cease to be a national of their country of origin. A provision in the agreement provided exemptions for married couples, but as France did not recognize same-sex marriage in 2006, it was deemed to be not applicable to him as he was not considered to be married under French law.

Due to the case which sparked national outrage, the Sarkozy administration announced that it would be taking steps to denounce some portions in the agreements with the Netherlands and other countries in 2009. France later denounced Chapter I of the Council of Europe's Convention on the Reduction of Cases of Multiple Nationality and on Military Obligations in Cases of Multiple Nationality of May 6, 1963. The denunciation took effect on March 5, 2009.

Citizenship of the European Union
Because France forms part of the European Union, French citizens are also citizens of the European Union under European Union law and thus enjoy rights of free movement and have the right to vote in elections for the European Parliament. When in a non-EU country where there is no French embassy, French citizens have the right to get consular protection from the embassy of any other EU country present in that country. French citizens can live and work in any country within the EU and EFTA as a result of the right of free movement and residence granted in Article 21 of the EU Treaty.

Denaturalization
According to Giorgio Agamben, France was one of the first European countries to pass denaturalization laws, in 1915, with regard to naturalized citizens of "enemy" origins. Its example was followed by most European countries.

As early as July 1940, Vichy France set up a special Commission charged with reviewing the naturalizations granted since the 1927 reform of the nationality law. Between June 1940 and August 1944, 15,000 persons, mostly Jews, were denaturalized. This bureaucratic designation was instrumental in their subsequent internment and murder.

Previous law: Article 21-19(5º)
In 2001, as Bill Clinton finished his second term as President of the U.S. (the legal limit of terms under the U.S. Constitution), a theory was published by CNN that he could claim citizenship of France and run for leadership there. The open-letter by historian Patrick Weil held that a little known "law, passed in 1961 [article 21-19(5º)], enables people from former French territories to apply for immediate naturalisation, bypassing the normal five-year residency requirement for would-be French citizens." As Clinton was born in Arkansas which had been part of French Louisiana before it was sold to the US, it was held that he would qualify under this law. And as a naturalised French citizen, he could run in the French presidential election.

Clinton himself later repeated this claim in 2012 as an amusing thought when speaking to an interviewer. Clinton had always dismissed the idea, and at the time of his retelling of the story in 2012, unknown to him, the possibility had already ended. This was because article 21-19(5º) of the Code civil was repealed (by article 82 of law 2006–911) on July 25, 2006, under the direction of Nicolas Sarkozy, who was then Minister of the Interior. Since "Weil's article made this provision of the French nationality law notorious, the French parliament abolished it".

See also
 French Foreign Legion
 French people living outside France
 Immigration to France
 Illegal immigration

References

Bibliography
Citizenship and Nationhood in France and Germany, by Rogers Brubaker, Harvard University Press (1992)   
Peasants Into Frenchmen : The Modernization of Rural France, 1870–1914, by Eugen Weber, Chatto and Windus (1977)

External links
  Acquisition de la nationalité française 
 Acquiring another Citizenship (France) (archived from the original on 2007-08-07)
 official website of the CIMADE, an ecumenist NGO helping immigrants (including illegal immigrants) in their juridical demands.
 GISTI ("Groupe d'Information et de Soutien aux Travailleurs Immigrés") (same: "Group of Information and Support of Immigrants Workers", although they also carry more directly activist actions, such as blocking controversial expelling by charter, mainly by informing all passengers of the plane: as the pilot is the only authority on board, he may refuse to embark an illegal alien, thus blocking police's attempts)
 CITIZENSHIP IN FRANCE.; A NEW LAW WHICH CLASHES WITH AMERICAN IDEAS." The New York Times – August 6, 1889
 Geneanum : French naturalization records for genealogical purposes
 :fr:Nationalité française

 
France and the European Union